Galasa rubidana is a species of snout moth in the genus Galasa. It was described by Francis Walker in 1866 and is known from Jamaica.

References

Moths described in 1866
Chrysauginae